Choosey is an American hip hop artist based in Los Angeles who grew up in National City and Chula Vista, California. His debut studio album Black Beans (2019), produced by Exile, represented his Afro-Chicano heritage and conveyed themes of ethnic identity, gentrification, and Black-brown unity. The album received positive reviews and was referred to as a "masterpiece" by NBC News and a "breath of fresh air" by HipHopDX.

Personal life 
Choosey's grandfather Tata Vasquez was involved in the Latin Jazz scene of Los Angeles, playing in Eddie Cano’s band and appearing in the film Rock Around The Clock (1956). Vasquez was described as influential to how Choosey creates music, who reminded him to create music from the soul.

In an interview with Remezcla, Choosey stated that he grew up in a household that was both Black and Mexican. He stated that he always felt that he belonged to both ethnic groups, which allowed him to see divisions between both groups as well as witnessing the beauty of collaboration: "Black and Brown love was making absolutely no headlines at the time while propaganda like ‘Black on Black Crime’ was one of the hottest topics of the 90s. I knew of a truth untold – a truth that I was a direct product of."

Career 
Choosey released his debut mixtape Left Field in 2015, a 16-track record for hip-hop label Dirty Science. His debut studio album Black Beans (2019) received positive reviews and was described as "nothing if not a fine work of art that’s timely and salient in this day and age." Lead single "Low Low" featured soul musician Aloe Blacc over a mariachi-infused instrumental. In 2020, he played at the Barrio Logan 3rd Annual La Vuelta Summer Festival.

Discography 
Studio albums

 Black Beans (2019)

Mixtapes

 Left Field (2015)

References 

African-American rappers
American rappers of Mexican descent
Chicano rap
Chicano
Hispanic and Latino American rappers